Vigor is a clone of vi for UNIX that adds a parody of Clippit, the Microsoft Office assistant. The name is a portmanteau of vi (the name of the Unix text editor) and Igor, Dr. Frankenstein's assistant. Vigor was written by Joel Ray "Piquan" Holveck in Sunnyvale, California, and the logo for Vigor was created by Tom Mulder. Vigor has spawned ports to other text editors as well, including Vim. There is also a Vigor visualization plugin for the audio player XMMS.

The idea for Vigor originated in the User Friendly webcomic by J.D. "Illiad" Frazer.

Vigor is currently hosted on SourceForge.net. Released under the original 4-clause BSD license, Vigor is free software.

See also

References 

Free software programmed in Tcl
Software that uses Tk (software)
Text editors